is a lighthouse located at the southern tip of the Bōsō Peninsula, in the city of Minamibōsō, Chiba Prefecture Japan.

History
The Nojimazaki Lighthouse was one of eight lighthouses to be built in Meiji period Japan under the provisions of the Anglo-Japanese Treaty of Amity and Commerce of 1858, signed by the Bakumatsu period Tokugawa Shogunate. The lighthouse was designed and constructed by French engineer Léonce Verny, and is noteworthy in that it is the second lighthouse to be completed in Japan, after the Kannonzaki Lighthouse on the opposing entrance to Tokyo Bay. The lighthouse was first lit on January 19, 1869.

During the 1923 Great Kantō earthquake, the top eight meters of the structure collapsed. It was rebuilt in concrete, and recommissioned on August 15, 1925. The structure was again damaged in 1945 by bombardment by the United States Navy. It was repaired after the war with a second-order Fresnel lens, and was subsequently electrified.

Current status
The Nojimazaki Lighthouse is currently open to the public, who may visit a small museum at its base, and climb to the top for a panoramic view over the Pacific Ocean. It is registered with the International Association of Lighthouse Authorities as one of the “One Hundred Most Important Lighthouses in the World” and by the Japanese government as a Historic Monument.

Gallery

See also 

 List of lighthouses in Japan

References 

Brunton, Richard. Building Japan, 1868–1879. Japan Library, 1991. 
Pedlar, Neil. The Imported Pioneers: Westerners who Helped Build Modern Japan. Routledge, 1990. 
 Polak, Christian. (2001). Soie et lumières: L'âge d'or des échanges franco-japonais (des origines aux années 1950). Tokyo: Chambre de Commerce et d'Industrie Française du Japon, Hachette Fujin Gahōsha (アシェット婦人画報社).
 Sims, Richard. (1998). French Policy Towards the Bakufu and Meiji Japan 1854–1894: A Case of Misjudgement and Missed Opportunities. London: RoutledgeCurzon. ;

External links 

 Lighthouses in Japan 

Lighthouses completed in 1869
Buildings and structures in Chiba Prefecture
Lighthouses in Japan
Museums in Chiba Prefecture
Lighthouse museums in Japan
1869 establishments in Japan
Minamibōsō